"A Sketch of the Past" is an autobiographical essay written by Virginia Woolf in 1939.  It was written as a break from writing her biography of Roger Fry, English artist and critic, and fellow member of the Bloomsbury Group.  It was later edited and posthumously published by Leonard Woolf and now can be found in Moments of Being, a collection of her autobiographical writing.

External links
 Manuscript of Virginia Woolf's unfinished memoir "A Sketch of the Past"
 A Discussion on "A Sketch of the Past"

Works by Virginia Woolf
1939 essays
American memoirs